Amos Phelps Granger (June 3, 1789 – August 20, 1866) was a U.S. Representative from New York, cousin of Francis Granger.

Early life
Granger was born in Suffield, Connecticut on June 3, 1789. He was the youngest of four children born to Dr. Amos Granger (1748–1811) and Ann Phelps (1753–1806).  His father was a prominent physician who served in the Connecticut Legislature from 1788 to 1791 and also served in the militia alongside General Horatio Gates during the American Revolutionary War   He was a first cousin of fellow U.S. Representative Francis Granger through his uncle, Gideon Granger, the longest-serving United States Postmaster General (under Presidents Thomas Jefferson and James Madison).

Granger attended the public schools.

Career
In 1811, he moved to Manlius, New York, where he was president of the town for several years.  He served as captain in the War of 1812 at Sackets Harbor and on the Canada–US border.

He moved to Syracuse, New York, in 1820 and engaged in numerous business enterprises. He served as trustee of the city of Syracuse from 1825 to 1830, during which time he delivered the address of welcome to General Lafayette when he visited Syracuse in 1825. He served as delegate to the Whig National Convention in 1852.

Granger was elected as an Opposition Party candidate to the Thirty-fourth Congress and reelected as a Republican to the Thirty-fifth Congress from March 4, 1855 to March 3, 1859.  He was not a candidate for renomination in 1858 and retired from active business pursuits.

Personal life
On December 21, 1813, Granger was married to Charlotte Hickox (1790–1882), one of twelve children of Benjamin Hickox. They did not have any children together.

He was paralysed by a stroke in about 1860, and died after a bout of dysentery in Syracuse, New York, on August 20, 1866. He was interred in Oakwood Cemetery.

References

External links

Amos Phelps Granger at the Office of the Historian of the United States House of Representatives

1789 births
1866 deaths
People from Suffield, Connecticut
New York (state) Whigs
Opposition Party members of the United States House of Representatives from New York (state)
Republican Party members of the United States House of Representatives from New York (state)
People from Manlius, New York
Politicians from Syracuse, New York
American military personnel of the War of 1812
Burials at Oakwood Cemetery (Syracuse, New York)
19th-century American politicians
Military personnel from Syracuse, New York